Dermot Crowley (born 19 March 1947) is an Irish stage, film and television actor.

Life and career

Theatre
Crowley's stage work has included a leading role in an Olivier Award winning production of Conor McPherson's The Weir, which played in the United Kingdom, Ireland and the United States in the late 1990s. His first television role was playing George Bernard Shaw in the UK TV series Victorian Scandals in 1976.

In 2011, he appeared in The Cripple of Inishmaan with the Druid Theatre Company at the Kirk Douglas Theater in Los Angeles. He won the L.A. Drama Critics Circle Award for Featured Performance.

Film and television
Crowley played General Crix Madine in Return of the Jedi. He played Sgt. François Duval in Son of the Pink Panther. Crowley went on to appear in Call Red, Father Ted (as Father Liam Deliverance), Dangerfield, Jonathan Creek, A Touch of Frost, Holby City, The Bill, Midsomer Murders and Luther, among others. In 1987 Crowley auditioned for the role of the Seventh Doctor in Doctor Who. Footage of his screen test was included on the special features of the DVD release of Time and the Rani.

Crowley also appeared as the crooked Mr. Simpson in The Adventure of the Clapham Cook, which was the very first episode of Agatha Christie's Poirot in 1989. He read the voice of Molloy on the Naxos 2003 Audiobook of Samuel Beckett's novel Molloy.

He appeared in the feature film The Best Offer in 2013. In 2012 he starred in a new series Hunted for BBC One and HBO. He played George Ballard, an MI6 Spy Chief in episodes 4 and 5.

Crowley often appears on BBC radio in drama such as Mind's Eye. In 2013, he played Pat Whyte in Father Figure. In 2017, he played the role of Lazar Kaganovich in the critically acclaimed political satire, The Death of Stalin.

Filmography

Film

Television

References

External links 

1947 births
Living people
People from County Cork
Irish male television actors
Irish male film actors
Irish male stage actors